, also known as Doraemon and the Kingdom of Clouds, is a feature-length Doraemon film which premiered on March 7, 1992, in Japan, based on the 12th volume of the same name of the Doraemon Long Stories series. It's the 13th Doraemon film.

Plot 
Before the film, a spaceship advises an old man to leave the island he is staying on with his son and grandson. At night, a flood wipes off the landmass. At present, Nobita asks his teacher if Heaven exists in clouds. After forcing Doraemon, they solidify build a kingdom of clouds with the help of robots. They later on invite Gian, Suneo and Shizuka to invest for building the castle. With most shares from Suneo, they build the kingdom with various facilities of their interests. The friends enjoy their respective dreams every day at the Heaven. Doraemon also gives Nobita a crown that makes everyone in their cloud obey him, and a Flying Shawl.

Meanwhile, various nature areas of Earth are reported to have been stolen by a cloud. In Africa, a group of illegal poachers also get lifted. As the news reaches Nobita, the city cloud hits a mountain. Doraemon and Nobita check and find the boy— seen in the beginning— unconscious while riding Cryptodon, a turtle-like creature. They cure his fever and put him to rest. Before going home, Doraemon adds a Time Handle on the Anywhere Door, allowing it to function like the Time Machine. That night, Doraemon researches about the Cryptodon, and realizes it's a prehistoric animal that should've gone extinct. The next day, the group learns that the boy disappeared. When they're looking for their cloud kingdom, they wind up arriving at a mysterious land inside a cloud.

They meet Paruparu, a sky-human who explains that they are in the Kingdom of Clouds, a kingdom in the sky designed by humans who resorted to live in the sky after Earth began to inhabit. She reveals that natural resources were picked from Earth to prevent them from extinction. Nobita and his friends are offered shelter, but escape, mistaking the sky humans for locking them up. They are separated due to a thunderstorm. A lightning bolt hits and internally damages Doraemon. Gian, Suneo and Shizuka are held by the sky humans while Nobita, his Flying Shawl ruined, looks for Doraemon and learns that he's malfunctioning.

The captive friends explore the kingdom with Paruparu, learning its history, and that the kingdom would carry out the Noah's plan to destroy human cities and everything that's polluting Earth. Meanwhile, Nobita and Doraemon meet their lilliputian friend Hoi whom they once helped. The island boy is revealed to be named Tagaro who tells that the control center can determine location of a person wearing the special ring. Because Nobita doesn't wear it, Hoi helps transport Nobita and Doraemon using a giant bird. Seemingly through luck, they ended up in their own heaven cloud, but when they use the Anywhere Door, the Earth is hit by an extreme flood. During the chaos, Doraemon fixes himself when his head hits a pole and saves Nobita, realizing the flood destroys the entire city. When they return to the cloud, they realize the Time Handle was set to the future when Nobita's mother turns it. Knowing the flood came from the sky-human's Noah's plan, they planned to stop it from happening.

To prevent the flood, Doraemon reveals a cannon that can destroy any cloud, although he has no intention of using it, instead just using it as a bluff and leverage against the sky human. Meanwhile, the group of illegal poachers escapes and crash land on Nobita's cloud. Although Doraemon and Nobita helped them, the poachers then took them captive by stealing Nobita's crown and started firing the cannon. Failing to help them, the captive friends and Paruparu are thrown into jail where they meet Nobita and Doraemon. Feeling responsible for revealing the cannon, Doraemon destroys city cloud gas using his iron head, which vanishes the cloud. Doraemon is gravely injured, while Paruparu addresses the court during a final trial. Nobita is supported by many of their friends whom he helped. Finally, a now-adult Kibo whom Nobita once helped revives Doraemon. With increased favor, the sky humans decide to abandon Noah's plan. Then Nobita and his friends are transported back to the Earth after bidding farewell to the sky humans. When they land, Shizuka reminds the friends of their homework due to which Nobita, Gian and Suneo collapse in tension.

Cast

Release
The film was released in the theatres of Japan on 7 March 1992.

References

External links 
 Doraemon The Movie 25th page 
 

Films directed by Tsutomu Shibayama
1992 films
1992 anime films
Nobita and the Kingdom of Clouds
Environmental films
Toho animated films
Films scored by Shunsuke Kikuchi
Films set in Germany